Zemnick is a village and a former municipality in Wittenberg district in Saxony-Anhalt, Germany. Since 1 January 2011, it is part of the town Zahna-Elster. It belonged to the administrative municipality (Verwaltungsgemeinschaft) of Elbaue-Fläming.

Geography
Zemnick is a round village and lies about 19 km southeast of Lutherstadt Wittenberg.

Buildings
In 1888, the church was built with an organ by Conrad Geissler.

Economy and transportation
Federal Highway (Bundesstraße) B 187 between Wittenberg and Jessen is about 5 km to the south.

References

Former municipalities in Saxony-Anhalt
Zahna-Elster